Smaïn (born Smaïn Fairouze, on January 3, 1958 in Constantine, Algeria) is a French comedian, humorist, writer, actor and director of Algerian descent.

Filmography
 1984 : La smala

References

External links
 

1958 births
Living people
People from Constantine, Algeria
French people of Algerian descent
French humorists
French male stage actors
French male film actors
French male television actors
French male voice actors
French male writers
La France a un incroyable talent
Algerian stand-up comedians